Prohylus phanthasma is a species of beetle in the family Cerambycidae, and the only species in the genus Prohylus. It was described by Martins and Galileo in 1990.

References

Onciderini
Beetles described in 1990